The King William's Town Nature Reserve is a nature reserve in Qonce (King William's Town) in the Eastern Cape.

History 
This 108.64 ha reserve was created in 1973 for the conservation of the region's fauna and flora.

See also 

 List of protected areas of South Africa

References 

Nature reserves in South Africa
Eastern Cape Provincial Parks